The duties of local government in the United Kingdom concern the functions, powers and obligations of local government in England, Wales, Scotland and Northern Ireland. While the Local Government Act 1972 and the Localism Act 2011 set out general powers to do anything necessary to fulfill their duties, and to act with full capacity (such as a limited company can), there is no codified list of powers set out in a statute. Instead, there are around 220 duties found in various pieces of legislation falling under the Ministry of Housing, Communities and Local Government, and 1120 pieces of legislation falling under other departments.

List of powers

Department of Communities administered duties
In 2011, there were 220 legislative duties of local authorities for which the Department of Communities is responsible.

Other department duties
In 2011, there were 1120 legislative duties of local authorities for which other government departments are responsible.

See also
UK constitutional law

Notes

External links
Duties placed on authorities by legislation for which DCLG is responsible
Duties placed on authorities by legislation for which departments other than DCLG have responsibility 

Constitutional laws of the United Kingdom